The 1928–29 season was Manchester United's 33rd season in the Football League.

First Division

FA Cup

References

Manchester United F.C. seasons
Manchester United